The Law School Democrats of America (Law School Dems), or the National Democratic Law Students Council (NDLSC), is the law student arm of the Democratic National Committee. Membership consists of over 1500 law students at more than 85 law schools located throughout the United States.

History 
Law School Democrats of America was founded in 2006 at Harvard Law School by David Burd. The organization's first event was a national convention, keynoted by DNC Chairman Howard Dean, at Harvard Law School. Originally consisting of a small number of the Ivy League law schools, the organization has grown substantially since its founding, and now has chapters at law schools in every region of the United States. The NDLSC works with the Democratic National Committee and other organizations on issues such as election reform and voter protection.  NDLSC continues to found new chapters and expand membership, and coordinate the placement of law students to work on Democratic campaigns, including the upcoming 2012 presidential re-election.

Activities 
Since 2006, hundreds of law students have taken an active role in Democratic politics, and local and national elections as members of the Law School Democrats. Student activities have included canvassing, legal research, phone banking, voter protection, and other activities.

The Law School Democrats seek to ensure that every eligible voter is allowed to cast a vote and that every vote is counted, support Democratic campaigns and candidates, connect law students and attorneys interested in Democratic politics, and cultivate the next generation of Democratic leaders.

National Convention 
Every year the Law School Democrats holds a national convention. The convention generally takes place in February or March over a weekend, and consists of discussion panels, keynote speakers, receptions, and an election for a new board of directors (President, Vice-President of Communications, Vice-President of Finance, Vice-President of Membership, Vice-President of Programming). During election years, regional directors are often appointed by the board of directors to help coordinate law student involvement in Democratic campaigns and voter protection efforts.

Past conventions were held in Boston, New York City, Columbus, Ohio, Chicago, and Washington, D.C. Notable convention speakers include former DNC Chairman and Vermont Governor Howard Dean, New York Congressman Charles B. Rangel, Democratic political consultant Bob Shrum, Illinois Treasurer and former U.S. Senate candidate Alexi Giannoulias, Maryland Attorney General Doug Gansler, and Illinois Congresswoman Jan Schakowsky.

The 2011 Law School Democrats National Convention took place April 1–3 at the Georgetown University Law Center in Washington, D.C.

Chapters

 American University Washington College of Law
 Appalachian School of Law
 Capital University Law School
 Benjamin N. Cardozo School of Law
 Brooklyn Law School
 Case Western Reserve University School of Law
 Catholic University Columbus School of Law
 Charlotte School of Law
 Charleston School of Law
 City University of New York School of Law
 Cleveland-Marshall College of the Law
 Columbia Law School
 Cornell Law School
 Creighton University School of Law
 Drake University Law School
 Duke University School of Law
 Emory University School of Law
 Florida Coastal School of Law
 Florida State University College of Law
 Fordham University School of Law
 Georgetown University Law Center
 George Mason University School of Law
 George Washington University Law School
 Hamline University School of Law
 Harvard Law School
 Hofstra University School of Law
 Indiana University Robert H. McKinney School of Law
 Lewis and Clark Law School
 Loyola University Chicago School of Law
 Loyola Law School Los Angeles
 Marquette University Law School
 McGeorge School of Law
 Monterey College of Law
 New York Law School
 New York University Law School
 Northwestern University School of Law
 Ohio State Moritz College of Law
 Pepperdine University School of Law
 Roger Williams University School of Law
 Rutgers School of Law–Camden
 St. John's University School of Law
 Seton Hall University School of Law
 South Texas College of Law
 Southern Illinois University School of Law
 Stetson University College of Law
 Seattle University School of Law
 Suffolk University Law School
 Temple University Beasley School of Law
 Texas Tech University School of Law
 Tulane University Law School
 University at Buffalo Law School
 UC Berkeley School of Law
 UC Davis School of Law
 UC Hastings College of the Law
 UCLA School of Law (inactive)
 University of Arkansas at Little Rock School of Law
 University of Chicago Law School
 University of Colorado Law School
 University of Connecticut School of Law
 University of Denver College of Law
 University of Florida College of Law
 University of Georgia School of Law (inactive)
 University of Illinois College of Law (inactive)
 University of Iowa College of Law
 University of Maryland School of Law
 University of Miami School of Law (inactive)
 University of Minnesota Law School
 University of Mississippi School of Law (inactive)
 University of Missouri School of Law
 University of Pennsylvania Law School
 University of Pittsburgh School of Law
 University of Richmond School of Law (inactive)
 University of St. Thomas School of Law
 University of San Diego School of Law
 University of South Carolina School of Law
 University of South Dakota School of Law
 University of Southern California School of Law
 University of Virginia School of Law
 University of Wisconsin Law School
 University of Texas School of Law
 Valparaiso University School of Law
 Vanderbilt University Law School
 Villanova University School of Law
 Washington & Lee University School of Law
 West Virginia University College of Law
 Whittier Law School
 Widener University School of Law
 Yale Law School

See also
College Democrats
College Democrats of America
Young Democrats of America
High School Democrats of America

References

Democratic Party (United States) organizations
Student wings of political parties in the United States
Political organizations established in 2006